Seal Beach is a coastal city in Orange County, California, United States. As of the 2020 census, the population was 25,242, up from 24,168 at the 2010 census.

Seal Beach is located in the westernmost corner of Orange County. To the northwest, just across the border with Los Angeles County, lies the city of Long Beach and the adjacent San Pedro Bay. To the southeast are Huntington Harbour, a neighborhood of Huntington Beach, and Sunset Beach, also part of Huntington Beach. To the east lie the city of Westminster and the neighborhood of West Garden Grove, part of the city of Garden Grove. To the north lie the unincorporated community of Rossmoor and the city of Los Alamitos. A majority of the city's acreage is devoted to the Naval Weapons Station Seal Beach military base.

History

Indigenous 
The Tongva village of Motuucheyngna was located in what is now Seal Beach in the area of the Los Cerritos Wetlands. It was part of the greater area of Puvungna, which was a major ceremonial and regional trading center for the Tongva and Acjachemen. Villagers used te'aats to travel out to villages on Pimu (Santa Catalina Island) and other islands off the coast, now referred to as the Channel Islands. In 2003, a burial site of the village was disturbed in a  Seal Beach residential development, Hellman Ranch, that was met with opposition from the Tongva.

Anaheim Landing 
Beginning in the mid-1860s, the eastern area of what is now Old Town Seal Beach became known as Anaheim Landing. A warehouse and wharf had been built on a small bay where Anaheim Creek emptied into the Pacific Ocean. It was established by farmers and merchants in the newly settled town of Anaheim who wanted a closer, more convenient port to ship the wine they were growing and also to receive items they needed to help build homes and buildings in their new town.

For a few years Anaheim Landing came close to rivaling San Pedro for its volume of shipping, but the arrival of the railroad in Anaheim in 1875 made it easier to ship product via the rails than by hauling a wagon overland across 12 miles of soft soil to the Landing. However, the beaches and surrounding rolling Anaheim Landing had by this time also become popular as a getaway from hot summer days. Los Angeles newspapers talk of a permanent summer population of as many as 400 and even more on special days.

Throughout the year, the landing was also home to a number of fishing boats that plied the local fishing areas. This activity was written about by Nobel-prize winning author Henryk Sienkiewicz in a short essay, "The Cranes." The site of Anaheim Landing is now registered as a California Historical Landmark.

In 1903 Los Angeles realtor Philip A. Stanton, very familiar with the area from his time selling land in Anaheim, and Huntington Beach and also from representing the local real estate interests of banker (and Pacific Electric Railroad co-owner) Isaias W. Hellman, put together a syndicate to lay out the town of Bayside on the land between Anaheim Landing and Anaheim Bay and the eastern edge of Alamitos Bay.

Real estate development 
The new town would be along the still not-announced leg of the Pacific Electric which would run from Long Beach to Newport Beach.  As there was already a town called Bayside in Northern California (by Eureka) Stanton's group instead called their new town Bay City. Due to many factors—including competition from other beach resort areas (Long Beach, Redondo Beach and Venice/Ocean Park/Santa Monica), some national financial crises, and the 1906 San Francisco Earthquake which sent most investment dollars to the more lucrative rebuilding of San Francisco—Bay City failed miserably as a real estate investment.

In 1913, Stanton optioned the land to real estate promoter Guy M. Rush who invested in building a renovated pier with pavilions on either side. Rush also re-branded the town as Seal Beach and marketed it via postcards and advertisements around the country.  This too failed and by early 1915 Rush had let his options lapse.  In 1915 Stanton tried again, arranging to obtain some amusements from the closing San Francisco Panama-Pacific International Exposition and rebuild them as part of new amusement area which would be called The Joy Zone.

As part of this plan, the Bayside Land Company led a campaign to incorporate the town (October 27, 1915) and then had the new city council approve legal drinking in the town.  This made it different from the Pike at Long Beach which was a "dry city."  The Joy Zone, a beach-side amusement park built in 1916, was the first in Orange County.  It achieved some brief popularity, but the US entry into World War I and the resulting restrictions on rubber and metal dramatically impacted the amusement area.

After the war, Prohibition impacted the town's value as an amusement resort. After 1920, the town's location on two Bays with many inlets to offload bootleg liquor, its small police department, and its location on the county line, allowed it to become a popular place for rumrunners and then gamblers. From 1928 to 1939, the town had as many as six gambling establishments on Main Street.  In addition most of Southern California's famous gambling ships (Johanna Smith, Rose Isle, Johanna Smith II, SS Caliente, SS Tango, Showboat, Mt. Baker) operated off the Seal Beach just over the line from Long Beach.

With gambling being a misdemeanor, the trials were held in the town's municipal court and a Seal Beach jury never returned a guilty verdict, to the dismay of Orange County and Long Beach officials. But around 1941, with significant pressure being put on the gamblers by State Attorney General Earl Warren, most of the Seal Beach and gambling ship ended Their absence was soon filled by a former Los Angeles police detective named William L. Robertson.

World War II 
In early 1944. during World War II, the Navy purchased most of the land around Anaheim Landing to construct the United States Navy's Naval Weapons Station Seal Beach for loading, unloading, and storing of ammunition for the Pacific Fleet, and especially those US Navy warships home-ported in Long Beach and San Diego. With closure of the Concord Naval Weapons Station in Northern California, it has become the primary source of munitions for a majority of the United States Pacific Fleet.  The arrival of the Navy catalyzed a growth in population which eventually succeeded in shutting down Robertson's gambling operations.

Surfing has always had a presence in Seal Beach. Newspaper advertisements showing surfers were part of Guy M. Rush's "Seal Beach" campaign of 1913. The town hosted the mainland's first surfing competition—it was at a private gathering of the annual Minnesota Picnic. But its popularity really took off after the war with the arrival of legendary surfer Blackie August, who taught many of the local kids how to surf. August's son, Robert, was one of the pair of surfers featured in the classic surf film, Endless Summer. Local legends Jack Haley and Mike Haley were the winners of the first two national surfing championships.

2011 shooting

The deadliest mass killing in Orange County history occurred in Seal Beach. On October 12, 2011, a mass shooting took place at the local Salon Meritage hair salon. Eight people inside the salon and one person in the parking lot were shot, and only one victim survived. The suspect in the shooting, 41-year-old Scott Evans Dekraai, was arrested without incident and charged with eight counts of murder and one count of attempted murder. Prior to the shooting, there had been only one murder in Seal Beach during the previous four years.

Geography
Seal Beach is located at  (33.759283, -118.082396).

Seal Beach is bounded by the CDP of Rossmoor and the city of Los Alamitos to the north, the West Garden Grove neighborhood and city of Westminster to the east, Huntington Beach to the east and south, and the Pacific Ocean to the west.

Climate
Seal Beach has a semi-arid climate (Köppen climate classification BSh) with Mediterranean characteristics.

Demographics

2010
The 2010 United States Census reported that Seal Beach had a population of 24,168. The racial makeup of Seal Beach was 20,154 (83.4%) White (76.9% Non-Hispanic White), 279 (1.2%) African American, 65 (0.3%) Native American, 2,309 (9.6%) Asian, 58 (0.2%) Pacific Islander, 453 (1.9%) from other races, and 850 (3.5%) from two or more races. There were 2,331 Hispanic or Latino residents, of any race (9.6%).

The Census reported that 23,943 people (99.1% of the population) lived in households, 22 (0.1%) lived in non-institutionalized group quarters, and 203 (0.8%) were institutionalized.

There were 13,017 households, out of which 1,866 (14.3%) had children under the age of 18 living in them, 4,891 (37.6%) were opposite-sex married couples living together, 788 (6.1%) had a female householder with no husband present, 283 (2.2%) had a male householder with no wife present.  There were 383 (2.9%) unmarried opposite-sex partnerships, and 66 (0.5%) same-sex married couples or partnerships. Of the households, 6,312 (48.5%) were made up of individuals, and 4,340 (33.3%) had someone living alone who was 65 years of age or older. The average household size was 1.84.  There were 5,962 families (45.8% of all households); the average family size was 2.65.

In Seal Beach there were 3,151 people (13.0%) under the age of 18, 1,176 people (4.9%) aged 18 to 24, 4,076 people (16.9%) aged 25 to 44, 6,513 people (26.9%) aged 45 to 64, and 9,252 people (38.3%) who were 65 years of age or older.  The median age was 57.3 years. For every 100 females, there were 78.8 males.  For every 100 females age 18 and over, there were 76.3 males.

The homeowner vacancy rate was 2.0%; the rental vacancy rate was 4.4%.  17,689 people (73.2% of the population) lived in owner-occupied housing units and 6,254 people (25.9%) lived in rental housing units.

During 2009–2013, Seal Beach had a median household income of $51,242, with 9.9% of the population living below the federal poverty line.

2000
As of the census of 2000, there were 24,157 people, 13,048 households, and 5,884 families residing in the city. The population density was 2,099.5 inhabitants per square mile (810.3/km2). The racial makeup of the city was 88.91% White, 1.44% African American, 0.30% Native American, 5.74% Asian, 0.18% Pacific Islander, 1.28% from other races, and 2.16% from two or more races. Hispanic or Latino of any race were 6.43% of the population.

There were 13,048 households, out of which 13.8% had children under the age of 18 living with them, 38.2% were married couples living together, 5.3% had a female householder with no husband present, and 54.9% were non-families. Of all households, 48.8% were made up of individuals, and 34.5% had someone living alone who was 65 years of age or older. The average household size was 1.83 and the average family size was 2.65.

In the city, the population was spread out, with 13.3% under the age of 18, 4.0% from 18 to 24, 21.5% from 25 to 44, 23.7% from 45 to 64, and 37.5% who were 65 years of age or older. The median age was 54 years. For every 100 females, there were 78.3 males. For every 100 females age 18 and over, there were 75.4 males.

The median income for a household in the city was $42,079, and the median income for a family was $72,071. Males had a median income of $61,654 versus $41,615 for females. The per capita income for the city was $34,589. About 3.2% of families and 5.5% of the population were below the poverty line, including 6.2% of those under age 18 and 5.3% of those age 65 or over.

Economy

The major employer in Seal Beach is Boeing, employing roughly 1,000 people. Its facility was originally built to manufacture the second stage of the Saturn V rocket for NASA's Apollo manned space flight missions to the Moon and for the Skylab program. Boeing Homeland Security & Services (airport security, etc.) is based in Seal Beach and Boeing Space & Intelligence Systems (satellite systems and classified programs) is headquartered in Seal Beach.

Top employers
According to the city's 2009 Comprehensive Annual Financial Report, the top employers in the city are:

Arts and culture

Annual cultural events
The Lions Club Pancake Breakfast in April and its Fish Fry (started in 1943) in July are two of the biggest events in Seal Beach. There has been a Rough Water Swim the same weekend as the Fish Fry since the 1960s. The Seal Beach Chamber of Commerce sponsors many events, including: a Classic Car Show in April, a Summer Concert series once every week in July and August, the Christmas Parade in December along with Santa and the Reindeer. Also in the fall is the Kite Festival in September. The Taste for Los Al, which since 2001 has been benefitting activities at Los Alamitos High School (home high school for Seal Beach students), takes place every October and has one of the largest silent auctions in the nation, often having over 100 tables.

Music
The record label Mash Down Babylon Records is based in Seal Beach, operated out of a garage known as The Elizabethan. The label was founded by Matt Embree, lead vocalist and guitarist in the Seal Beach-based progressive rock/post-hardcore band RX Bandits.

Other points of interest

On Electric Avenue where the railroad tracks used to run, there is the Red Car Museum which features a restored Pacific Electric Railway Red Car.  The Balboa Line once passed through Seal Beach going south to the Balboa Peninsula in Newport Beach. Going north into Long Beach a rider could then take the Red Cars through much of Los Angeles County.

Seal Beach is also home to the Bay Theatre, which was a popular venue for independent film and revival screenings. It was closed in 2012 but was purchased in 2017 by Paul Dunlap who is currently restoring it.

The Seal Beach National Wildlife Refuge is located on part of the Naval Weapons Station Seal Beach. Much of the refuge's  is the remnant of the saltwater marsh in the Anaheim Bay estuary (the rest of the marsh became the bayside community of Huntington Harbour, which is part of Huntington Beach). Three endangered species, the Ridgway's light-footed rail, the California least tern, and the Belding's Savannah sparrow, can be found nesting in the refuge. With the loss and degradation of coastal wetlands in California, the remaining habitat, including the Bolsa Chica Ecological Reserve in Huntington Beach and Upper Newport Bay in Newport Beach, has become much more important for migrating and wintering shorebirds, waterfowl, and seabirds. Although the refuge is a great place for birdwatching, because it is part of the weapons station, access is limited and usually restricted to once-a-month tours.

Recreation

The second longest wooden pier in California (the longest is in Oceanside) is located in Seal Beach and is used for fishing and sightseeing. The pier has periodically suffered severe damage due to storms and other mishaps, requiring extensive reconstruction. A plaque at the pier's entrance memorializes Federal Emergency Administration of Public Works, 1938, Project No. Calif. 1723-F, a rebuilding necessitated by storms in 1935. Another plaque honors the individuals, businesses, and groups who helped rebuild the pier after a storm on March 2, 1983, tore away several sections. A "Save the Pier" group formed in response to an initial vote by the City Council not to repair the pier. The ensuing outcry of dismay among residents caused the City Council to reverse its stance while claiming the city lacked the necessary funds. Residents mobilized and eventually raised $2.3 million from private and public donors to rebuild the pier.

Surfing locations in Seal Beach include the Seal Beach pier and the river-"Stingray Bay" (or Ray Bay—the surfer's nickname for the mouth of the San Gabriel River—the stingrays are attracted by the heated water from several upstream powerplants). Classic longboard builders in the area include Harbour Surfboards, established in 1959, in Seal Beach.

Government and politics
The city is administered under a council-manager form of government, and is governed by a five-member city council serving four-year alternating terms.  The mayor and mayor pro tempore are chosen by and from the council.

Seal Beach's municipal jail offers a pay for stay program in which offenders who would normally go to county jails could stay at Seal Beach's jail for a price.

State and federal representation

Education
Seal Beach once had its own elementary school district and sent its older children to Huntington Beach or Marina High School in the Huntington Beach Union High School District. Since the early 1980s it has been part of the Los Alamitos Unified School District. Younger students (K-5) go to McGaugh Elementary School, Hopkinson Elementary School, Rossmoor Elementary, Lee Elementary, Los Alamitos Elementary or Weaver Elementary. Students in grades 6–8 attend either Oak Middle School or McAuliffe Middle School.  High school students go to Los Alamitos High School, which is a Gold Ribbon School. Until 2000, the Orange County High School of the Arts was part of Los Alamitos High School. In 2000, the school district suffered a major blow when the community lost the Orange County High School of the Arts to Santa Ana, where it is now located.

Notable people
 Andrija Artuković, Nazi collaborator convicted of war crimes.
 Robert August, one of the two surfers in Bruce Brown's classic surf film The Endless Summer, grew up in Seal Beach.
 Jimmy Bennett, Actor, born in Seal Beach. Portrayed Captain Kirk (during his childhood) in Star Trek.
 Sean Collins, founder of Surfline.
 Susan Egan, actress/singer, starred in broadway productions including the role of Belle from Beauty and the Beast also does voice work most notably Meg from Disney's Hercules, born in Seal Beach.
 Matt Embree, vocalist/guitarist of the band RX Bandits and founder of the Mash Down Babylon Records record label, both of which are also based in Seal Beach.
 Steve Goodman, singer-songwriter and author of "City of New Orleans", "A Dying Cubs Fan's Last Request" and "You Never Even Call Me By My Name" made Seal Beach his home from 1980 until his death in 1984.
 Bill Green, former United States record holder in track and field and fifth in the hammer throw in the 1984 Summer Olympics lived in Seal Beach from 1988 to 1999
Jack Haley, Sr - first US National surfing Champion
Mike Haley - 2nd US National surfing champion
Jack Haley, Jr. - former NBA player
 Chris Kluwe, punter for the Minnesota Vikings of the NFL
 Greg Knapp, New York Jets pass game specialist.
 Pat McCormick, a two-time Olympic platform and springboard gold medal diver (1952 & 1956).
 Chance Perez, singer, part of the boyband In Real Life.
 Jack Snow, Notre Dame and Los Angeles Rams football player
 Clayton Snyder, actor who played Ethan Craft in the Lizzie McGuire TV show and film.
 Michelle Steel, U.S. Congresswoman from California's 48th district since 2021 (resident of Surfside Colony), former Chair of the Orange County Board of Supervisors.
 Randy Stonehill, Grammy nominated singer/songwriter resides in Seal Beach with wife Sandi
 Chad Wackerman, rock and jazz drummer who has worked with Frank Zappa, Barbra Streisand, James Taylor and many others
 Bill Ward, drummer, solo artist, and occasional lead vocalist of hard rock/heavy metal band, Black Sabbath.
 Bob Welch, professional baseball player

See also
List of beaches in California

References

External links

Seal Beach National Wildlife Refuge
Seal Beach Naval Weapons Station
Seal Beach Naval Weapons Station at globalsecurity.org

 
1915 establishments in California
Cities in Orange County, California
Incorporated cities and towns in California
Populated coastal places in California
Populated places established in 1915
Surfing locations in California